Mega Man Battle Network 4 is a video game developed by Capcom for the Game Boy Advance (GBA) handheld game console. It is the fourth game in the Mega Man Battle Network series. The European version featured a completely different logo, which was also used on Mega Man X7, Mega Man X8, Mega Man Zero 2, Mega Man Zero 3, Mega Man Zero 4, Mega Man X: Command Mission, Mega Man Network Transmission, Mega Man Battle Chip Challenge, Mega Man Battle Network 3, and Mega Man Battle Network 5. Like Battle Network 3 before it, Battle Network 4 has two different versions, Red Sun and Blue Moon, that differ in story and gameplay details. Battle Network 4 is compatible with the e-Reader, and can be linked up with Rockman EXE 4.5 Real Operation and the Battle Chip Gate for NetBattles. It is able to link with Mega Man Zero 3, and contains references to Konami's Boktai series.

Plot
The beginning of the game shows the player at a space research center known in-game as NAXA. Scientists have discovered a massive asteroid speeding toward the earth that, if made contact with, would end all life on earth. 

The game then cuts to the protagonists, Lan Hikari and MegaMan.EXE (in this continuity a Network Navigator or NetNavi, an in-universe AI program), going shopping with their father. While in the electronics district, they find themselves pitted against a NetNavi known as ShadeMan, portrayed as having strong dark powers. Upon defeating ShadeMan, he disappears, dropping unknown data. It is revealed to Lan and MegaMan to be a DarkChip, a program described as unleashing great power at the cost of the Navi's soul (their goodness and well-being). The duo are warned to never use it under any circumstances.

The game cuts back to the scientists, who are now joined by some of the best scientists and researchers of various countries, including the duo's father. They come to the conclusion that the best way to avoid impact with the asteroid is to use a laser to move it off-course.

The game again changes to the perspective of the protagonists. The next in-game day, after the ShadeMan incident, Lan and MegaMan participate in the Den Battle Tournament, the local NetBattle tournament, and become the champions. After completing the tourney, they return home to find it burglarized by someone connected to the DarkChip. Upon investigation, they discover that the DarkChip Syndicate Nebula was behind the attack of their home, looking for the DarkChip the two possess. After defeating a Nebula member in battle, he warns the duo that the syndicate has their eye on them and the DarkChip.

With no leads to go on, the pair decide to go to the amusement park, only to find the animatronics going haywire. Lan and MegaMan find ShadeMan in one of the animatronic animals. In order to best ShadeMan, MegaMan has no other option but to use the DarkChip. 

Now, without the DarkChip or ShadeMan, the duo decide to enter the Eagle/Hawk Tournament held by the amusement park. The team emerge victorious once again. After the tournament, they meet LaserMan, the leader Navi of Nebula, who shows MegaMan the DarkSoul lurking within him now that he has used a DarkChip.

Meanwhile, the scientists fire the laser at the asteroid, but it fails. One of the scientists, Dr. Regal, claims to have an idea and asks for a world-class Net Operator and Navi.

Naturally, Lan and MegaMan are invited to the Red Sun/Blue Moon Tournament, a competition explained as putting together the best of the best of NetBattlers. After winning the tourney, the duo are taken to NAXA and are briefed on the situation. It is explained that the asteroid has a computer in it and can be steered away from the planet. Before Lan has the chance to send MegaMan to the asteroid, Dr. Regal reveals himself as the leader of Nebula and had been planning all along to use the asteroid in his plan for world domination. Still, Lan is able to send MegaMan, where he once again meets LaserMan, as well as Duo, the Operating System of the asteroid. MegaMan defeats both of them and convinces Duo that the planet is worthy enough to not be destroyed. The asteroid leaves, and Regal appeared to have committed suicide in order to avoid legal prosecution, but was revealed to be alive in the sequel. Once again, Lan and MegaMan have saved the world from the latest crisis.

Gameplay
Battle Network 4 greatly differs from Battle Network 3 in many ways, the most notable of which is the concept of DoubleSoul (Soul Unison in the original).  DoubleSoul is similar to how the classic-style Mega Man could acquire the weapons of the Robot Masters that he has defeated: by using DoubleSoul, Mega Man.EXE could use the powers of other NetNavis in the same manner as how classic Mega Man could use the powers of the Robot Masters through their weapons.  To perform a DoubleSoul, which lasts for a temporary amount of time (three turns), however, a chip must be sacrificed for the battle.

Another key feature is that it takes a minimum of three playthroughs of the game's main story mode in order to uncover all of its secrets - although many criticize the game for the same reason.  After each playthrough, a player is permitted to either continue with their existing game or to start a new game at a higher level of difficulty, although any save at a higher level of difficulty will overwrite a save of the lower level. Thus, it is very important for those players who want to collect all chips and power-ups to be sure that all blue/purple mystery datas and all V1 virus' chips and program advances have been collected before starting Level 2.  The same is true for going on to Level 3.

Finally, DarkChips, which are powerful chips resulting in a host of negative side-effects, make their debut in this game: a mood indicator in the corner of the screen shows the mood of MegaMan, and should the mood change to a negative one, random DarkChips will appear in Mega Man's Custom Screen. Each DarkChip will have many negative (and notable permanent) side-effects, that taint MegaMan's own soul with darkness.  Should the darkness overwhelm MegaMan, he will find  a different selection of chips are made available to use, with a different selection of Program Advances (like the infamous "DarkNeo" Program Advance, which involves the Bass GigaChip) therein. Also, when you use a DarkChip (aside from the battle with Shade Man in the ToyRobo and in free tournaments at Higsby's shop), Mega Man permanently loses 1 HP for each and cannot regain all HP lost, even if you were to purify yourself. There are also special chips (like the 5 evil chips) that can only be used if Mega Man is completely consumed by dark power.  Conversely, if Mega Man does enough battles (about 1000) without ever using a Dark Chip, he will turn brighter in color and allow him to more easily achieve Full Synchro mode.

Emotion Window
The Emotion Window is a mood indicator that lets the operator know Mega Man's current state based on fighting performance. The window also changes whenever DoubleSoul is used, to a mugshot of the corresponding Soul used.

Full Synchro is a heightened state of focus gained by performing a counter-attack against a virus (I.e. attacking the virus just before it attacks). In this state, Battlechip attacks are doubled in strength. It is possible to consecutively achieve Full Synchro by continuously counter-attacking and thus doubling effectiveness in battle. Full Synchro expires when the player fails to counter-attack a virus, or when MegaMan suffers damage.

Conversely, when a fight is not playing in Mega Man's favor, unless in a doublesoul, he gains an anxious expression and following this, Darkchips begin to display themselves in the Custom Screen. Also during this emotional state, DoubleSoul transformations are disabled.  The player can return to a normal, calm state by successfully counter-attacking a virus, restoring HP, scoring hits on the enemy, or winning the battle.

If, during battle, Mega Man suffers repeated hits at a rapid rate, or if he is stunned for a period of time, he goes into a state of rage which is similar to Full Synchro in the way that it doubles Battlechip attack power, but instead of a focused expression in the emotion window, Mega Man has an angry expression and in the battle screen he glows orange. As such, it can be considered a desperation state which gives the player a chance to turn the battle towards their favor. Rage will expire when the player attacks and damages a virus, or if the player successfully counter-attacks, at which point the player will instead go into Full Synchro. It also expires after a while if no chip is used. Unlike Full Synchro, if Mega Man is hit while in rage, he will not revert to his normal emotion. During "Full Synchro" and "Rage" Mega Man's attacks double, giving him an extra advantage.

The Emotion Window is a feature that has lived on in the Battle Network 5 and 6 games. The basic functions of the Emotion Window stated above (Full Synchro, Anxiety, and Rage) have not changed since, though the anxiety emotion has been removed in Battle Network 6, replaced with Tired and Very Tired status.

Battle Chips
"Battle Network 4" brings out many new chips, with standard chips weighing in with 150 unique attacks. Mega Chips fell in number from the previous game, only having 60 different chips. Instead of V1, V2, V3, V4, and V5 chips (previously found in Battle Network 1 and 2 with V4 and V5 chips found only in 3) are now (Navi), (Navi)SP, (Navi)DS. Five version-exclusive Giga Chips appear in each version. There are 56 new kinds of chips, called, Secret Chips. Most of these are obtained by winning Higsby's "Free Tournaments", though there are a few exceptions.  For example, the player may obtain the "Z-Saber" chip by linking their game with a copy of Mega Man Zero 3. There are eight DarkChips in this game with bad effects to your Navi's soul and emotions. (See above section for information on DarkChips.)

Title Screen Badges
In the previous two games, players earned different colored stars on the title screen for completing certain tasks. Battle Network 4 replaces these with badges (sometimes called icons or marks instead) on the top of the title screen, and continues these for the remainder of the series. Battle Network 4 includes seven icons, one for defeating the final boss Duo, one for getting all Soul Unisons, one for collecting all Standard-level battlechips, one for all Mega-level chips, one for all Giga-level chips, one for completing all Program Advances, and the last for defeating Bass (Forte in Japanese) in his Omega form.

Operation Battle Mode
Linking any edition of Mega Man Battle Network 4 with the Battle Chip Gate expansion for Game Boy Advance (Sold in Japan only) would allow you to play as a Navi, depending on what Navi chip you owned. Instead of selecting chips like in normal gameplay, the custom gauge at the top would fill up and change to four different colors as it filled up, white, yellow, and blue, and red. when the bar is yellow, you can use a regular chip. When it is blue, you can use a mega chip, and at red you can use a giga chip. shooting fills the gauge up faster.

Development
This game is known to become unplayable on original Nintendo DS systems. If the player leaves, and then returns to, the map while in Park Area during WoodMan's scenario, the game will hang indefinitely. This incompatibility was officially acknowledged by Nintendo. It does not occur on any other Nintendo DS family system or on any Game Boy Advance family systems.

Capcom of Japan gathered together their surplus of Rock Man EXE 4: Tournament Red Sun and Rock Man EXE 4: Tournament Blue Moon games and put them in a special edition box that was released in Japan only on December 31, 2004 along with a special E-Card for the E-Reader.

Reception

The two versions of Mega Man Battle Network 4 entered Japanese sales charts as the second and fourth best-selling games of their release week and continued to appear on the top 10 best-sellers list for the following six weeks. The game sold 535,836 copies combined by the end of 2003 and an additional 393,014 copies by the end of 2004. Mega Man Battle Network 4 has sold 1.35 million copies worldwide as of December 31, 2008, becoming the best-selling game in the Battle Network series.

Notes

References

External links
Official website 

Role-playing video games
Game Boy Advance games
4
Multiplayer and single-player video games
Tactical role-playing video games
2003 video games
Virtual Console games
Virtual Console games for Wii U
Video games developed in Japan
Video games with alternative versions